NFL Blitz 2002 is a video game published by Midway Games for Game Boy Advance in 2001, and for GameCube, PlayStation 2 and Xbox in 2002.

Reception

The game received "generally favorable reviews" on all platforms except the Game Boy Advance version, which received "unfavorable" reviews, according to the review aggregation website Metacritic.

References

External links
 
 

2001 video games
American football video games
Game Boy Advance games
GameCube games
North America-exclusive video games
PlayStation 2 games
Xbox games
Video games developed in the United States
Multiplayer and single-player video games